Ashlesha (Sanskrit: आश्लेषा or Āśleṣā) (Tibetan: སྐར་མ་སྐག), also known as Ayilyam in Tamil and Malayalam (Tamil: ஆயில்யம், Malayalam: ആയില്യം, Āyilyaṃ), is the 8th of the 27 nakshatras in Hindu astrology. Ashlesha is also known as the Clinging Star or Nāga. It is known as the Hydra. It extends from 16:40 to 30:00 Cancer.

The planetary lord is Mercury or Budha. Its presiding deities are the Nāgas.
The nakshatra's symbol is a coiled serpent. It is a trikshna or sharp nakshatra. Its animal symbol is the male cat.

See also
List of Nakshatras

References
  

Nakshatra